Blabomma californicum is a species of true spider in the family Dictynidae. It is found in the United States.

References

Dictynidae
Articles created by Qbugbot
Spiders described in 1895